The Zimbabwe Cricket Team toured Bangladesh from October 27 to November 5, 2009. The tour consisted of 5 ODIs.

Squads
No Squads were announced.

ODI series

1st ODI

2nd ODI

3rd ODI

4th ODI

5th ODI

Media coverage

Television
Bangladesh Television - Bangladesh
Supersport (live) – South Africa, Kenya, Zimbabwe and Pakistan.
Neo Sports (live) – India and Middle East

References

Bangladesh
2009 in Bangladeshi cricket
Bangladeshi cricket seasons from 2000–01
International cricket competitions in 2009–10
2009-10